Owen Guyatt (26 April 1919 – 13 October 1991) was an  Australian rules footballer who played with South Melbourne in the Victorian Football League (VFL).

Notes

External links 

1919 births
1991 deaths
Australian rules footballers from Victoria (Australia)
Sydney Swans players